Vroom is a 1991 racing video game developed by French studio Lankhor. The game was programmed by Daniel Macré.

In 1993, Lankhor adapted his game on the Sega Megadrive under FIA license under the title F1, published by Domark.

It spawned the sequels Vroom Data Disk and Vroom Multiplayer.

Critical reception 
The game received positive reviews from critics. Reviewers liked the fast-paced and simple-yet-addictive gameplay.

Amiga Computing said the fast-paced game had turned the reviewer into a "driving freak". Amiga Format wrote that the game was fast, fun, funky, and French. Meanwhile, The One For Amiga Games felt the game was both fast and fun, and an easy game to get into. Amiga Mania liked that the game was not overly complicated. Amiga Action confessed it was hard to fault the game. Amiga Power said the game was faster than F1 GP, more playable than Lotus Turbo Challenge 2, prettier than Outrun Europa, and with a sillier name than Super Hang-On. Nevertheless, the site acknowledged that the game was pitted against strong competition. Games-X wrote that the game was a great entry in an inexhaustible genre that kept getting better.

On the contrary, CU Amiga felt the simple gameplay was the title's downfall.

References

External links 
 Documentary on the series

Racing video games
1991 video games
Amiga games
Atari ST games
DOS games
Video games developed in France
Lankhor games